Sciaenurus is an extinct genus of prehistoric bony fish that lived during the lower Eocene.

See also

 Prehistoric fish
 List of prehistoric bony fish

References

Eocene fish
Eocene fish of North America
Eocene fish of Europe